Onosai Auva'a (born 7 February 1985 in Auckland) is a New Zealand rugby union footballer who has played for the Auckland Blues Super Rugby team and also for Auckland in the ITM Cup. Auva'a has signed for Sale Sharks on a two-month loan contract lasting until February 2012, but an outstanding performance against Leicester Tigers in the Aviva Premiership would appear to further Auva'a's aim of a long-term contract with the Sharks.

Career
At the 2006 Commonwealth Games he was part of the New Zealand Sevens team that won a gold medal.

Career history
 2011: Auckland Provincial team (ITM Cup)
 2010: Auckland Provincial team
 2009: New Zealand 7s, Auckland Blues, Auckland Provincial team
 2008: Auckland Blues, Auckland Provincial team
 2007: Auckland Blues, Auckland Provincial team
 2006: New Zealand 7s, Auckland Blues, Auckland Provincial team, Auckland 7s, New Zealand Under-21
 2005: Auckland Blues Development, Auckland Rugby Academy, Auckland Under-20s (captain)
 2004: New Zealand Under-19, Auckland Under-19's (captain)
 2001: New Zealand Under-16, Auckland Under-16's (captain)

References 

1985 births
New Zealand rugby union players
New Zealand sportspeople of Samoan descent
Auckland rugby union players
Rugby union flankers
Commonwealth Games gold medallists for New Zealand
Rugby sevens players at the 2006 Commonwealth Games
Blues (Super Rugby) players
Sale Sharks players
Counties Manukau rugby union players
New Zealand expatriate rugby union players
New Zealand expatriate sportspeople in England
Expatriate rugby union players in England
Rugby union players from Auckland
Living people
New Zealand international rugby sevens players
Commonwealth Games rugby sevens players of New Zealand
Commonwealth Games medallists in rugby sevens
Medallists at the 2006 Commonwealth Games